The following is a list of stations found within the Hangzhou Metro.

Line 1

Line 2

Line 3

Line 4

Line 5

Line 6

Line 7

Line 8

Line 9

Line 10

Line 16

Hanghai line

Notes

References

Metro
Hangzhou Metro stations
Hangzhou